The Wu Qingyuan Cup, also known as the Go Seigen Cup or Wu Qingyuan Cup World Women's Weiqi Tournament, is an international women's Go tournament. It was created in 2018 and is held annually. The tournament is named after Wu Qingyuan (better known by his Japanese name Go Seigen), and held in Fuzhou, Fujian Province, China, his birthplace. It is organized by the Chinese Weiqi Association and the Fuzhou municipical government.

Overview
The Wu Qingyuan Cup is played under Chinese rules with a 7.5 point komi. Each player has 2 hours of main time with five 60-second byoyomi periods. The winner receives 500,000 RMB in prize money, and the runner-up receives 200,000 RMB.

Past tournaments
The 1st Wu Qingyuan Cup winner was Kim Chae-young, who defeated Choi Jeong, a two-time women's world champion, in a 2–0 upset. Kim's head-to-head record against Choi had been 0–11 before the match.

Choi Jeong won the 2nd Wu Qingyuan Cup. It was her fifth women's international title, after four previous victories in the Bingsheng Cup. The tournament was also accompanied by a side event featuring 10-year old Nakamura Sumire 1p and 13-year old Wu Yiming 2p; Wu won 2–0, earning her a spot in the 3rd Cup.

In the 3rd Wu Qingyuan Cup, all four semifinalists were Chinese players. The winner was 18-year old Zhou Hongyu.

On 4 December 2021, Choi Jeong defeated Yu Zhiying and won the 4th Wu Qingyuan Cup.

Winners and runners-up

References

External links
gotoeveryone.k2ss.info

International Go competitions